Renáta Mörtel (born 12 October 1983 in Budapest) is a former Hungarian handballer who played for Siófok KC in left back position.

Achievements
Nemzeti Bajnokság I:
Winner: 2005, 2006
Silver Medallist: 2004, 2010, 2011
Magyar Kupa:
Winner: 2005, 2006
Silver Medallist: 2004, 2008, 2011
Slovenian Championship:
Winner: 2009
Slovenian Cup:
Winner:2009
EHF Cup:
Finalist: 2004, 2005
EHF Cup Winners' Cup:
Finalist: 2006
Semifinalist: 2003

Individual awards
 Nemzeti Bajnokság I Top Scorer: 2008

References

External links
 Renáta Mörtel career statistics at Worldhandball

1983 births
Living people
Hungarian female handball players
Handball players from Budapest
Expatriate handball players
Hungarian expatriates in Slovenia
Győri Audi ETO KC players
20th-century Hungarian women
21st-century Hungarian women